The Chevrolet Superior Series F was launched in 1923, manufactured by Chevrolet for four years with a different series per year. The 1923 model was known as the Series B, the 1924 model was the Series F, for 1925 it was known as the Series K and the 1926 Superior was known as the Series V. It was replaced in 1927 by the Series AA Capitol. It was the first Chevrolet that didn't have a larger companion model and was the only car sold by Chevrolet in several body style configurations all supplied by Fisher Body. Each year new mechanical changes, appearance updates or optional features that became standard in subsequent years became expected of all GM products including Chevrolet. Body styles were separated into open and closed which meant closed included retractable glass in the doors and glass surrounding rear seat passengers. Standard items included tools, a jack for tire removal, speedometer, outside lockable door handles, ammeter, oil pressure gauge, dashboard light, choke pull knob, electric horn, ignition theft lock, and a two piece vertical ventilating windshield that allowed fresh air to enter the passenger compartment. Wheels were 30" and came standard with hickory wood spokes or optional pressed steel discs. For 1925, bumpers were offered optionally along with outside side view mirrors, heater for passenger compartment and a clock.

All Superior models were powered by a  four-cylinder engine with 26 hp at 2000 rpm, and shared the  wheelbase. The cheapest complete model, which was the Superior Roadster, cost $510 in 1926 ($ in  dollars ), while the range-topping model, the Superior Sedan, sold for US$825 ($ in  dollars ). It was also possible to buy a chassis; the Commercial chassis cost $425, while the Express Truck chassis cost $525. Duco automotive lacquer paint, introduced by DuPont was the first quick drying multi-color line of nitrocellulose lacquers made especially for the automotive industry.

GM Platform sharing
This chassis was shared with other GM products at the time, including Cadillac, Buick, Oldsmobile, Oakland and GMC products, introducing the "A-body", "B-body" and "C-body". This policy of sharing mechanicals across multiple brand led to the General Motors Companion Make Program in the 1920s. Starting with leadership under Alfred P. Sloan, GM instituted visual styling changes for each yearly series under the business philosophy of planned obsolescence.

See also
 List of Chevrolet vehicles
 Star (automobile)
 Flint (automobile)
 Vauxhall Motors
 Durant Motors
 William C. Durant
 Alfred P. Sloan

References

Source: 

Superior
1920s cars